Szydłowo may refer to the following places:
Szydłowo, Gniezno County in Greater Poland Voivodeship (west-central Poland)
Szydłowo, Piła County in Greater Poland Voivodeship (west-central Poland)
Szydłowo, Masovian Voivodeship (east-central Poland)